The women's triple jump at the 1998 European Athletics Championships was held at the Népstadion on 19 and 20 August.

Medalists

Results

Qualification
Qualification: Qualification Performance 14.20 (Q) or at least 12 best performers advance to the final.

Final

References

Results
Results
Results

Triple Jump
Triple jump at the European Athletics Championships
1998 in women's athletics